The Quneitra Crossing  is a border crossing through the purple ceasefire line into the UNDOF controlled area between the Syrian controlled and the Israeli-occupied portion of the Golan Heights. It is on the southwestern outskirts of Quneitra, and not far from the Israeli settlement of Ein Zivan in the Golan Heights. Syrian Druze from the Golan Heights are permitted to cross through the passage to study, work and live in Syria proper.
The crossing is also used for the transfer of apples grown by Druze farmers under the auspices of the Red Cross. The only concrete guard post along the ceasefire line is at the Quneitra crossing.

History
The opening of a crossing at Quneitra took place after the Yom Kippur War in 1973. The UN Disengagement Observer Force (UNDOF) established its headquarters along the border. In order to carry out its work, UNDOF needed to move freely between Israel and Syria.

Since 2004, Druze have exported apples to Syria through the crossing. In 2010, some 10,000 tons of apples grown by Druze farmers in the Golan Heights were sent to Syria. In 2010, the Israeli government authorized a pilgrimage to Syria by a group of 300 Druze citizens of Israel interested in visiting religious sites there. A group of dancers from five Druze villages in the Golan Heights was sent to Aleppo to perform in a dabka competition. Israeli Druze civilians are permitted to cross the border at Quneitra for university studies and marriage. Since 1993, 67 Syrian brides have crossed into the Golan Heights and 11 brides from the Golan have crossed into Syria through the Quneitra crossing. This issue was the topic of the award-winning movie, The Syrian Bride.

The terminal usually closes at 6 p.m. but can be opened at any time to handle humanitarian emergencies, such as the transfer to Israel of a Druze dentistry student who suffered a stroke while studying in Syria.

On 6 June 2013 the crossing was attacked by Syrian rebels and temporarily occupied. Syrian government forces were able to quickly retake the crossing. A Filipino peacekeeper of the UNDOF was wounded during the fighting. As a result, the Austrian government announced to withdraw its troops from the UN mission.

On 27 August 2014 Syrian rebels again occupied the crossing.

Quneitra was reopened on October 15, 2018, for UNDOF personnel.

References

External links

 US Consular Information Sheet - Israel, the West Bank and Gaza
 ICRC activities in the occupied Golan

Israel–Syria border crossings
Golan Heights